Hamid Rahmouni (born 22 October 1967) is an Algerian former footballer who played as a forward. He made 18 appearances for the Algeria national team from 1989 to 1999 scoring twice. He was also named in Algeria's squad for the 1990 African Cup of Nations tournament.

References

External links
 

1967 births
Living people
Algerian footballers
Association football forwards
Algeria international footballers
Africa Cup of Nations-winning players
1990 African Cup of Nations players
ES Sétif players
JS Kabylie players
Stade Tunisien players
MC Alger players
NA Hussein Dey players
US Biskra players
Algerian expatriate footballers
Algerian expatriate sportspeople in Tunisia
Expatriate footballers in Tunisia
Place of birth missing (living people)

21st-century Algerian people